Borgo Egnazia is a luxury resort and spa in Fasano, Italy. It is owned by Aldo Melpignano, a former investment analyst. The resort has 45 acres of land which includes the San Domenico golf course and Vair spa, as well as a 28 villas and 63 hotel rooms.

The buildings are made of local calcar limestone and were designed in the typical historical style of the Apulian region. It took six years and a €150m investment to build.

Villas

The villas have three bedrooms and sleep up to six guests. Each has two living rooms, a kitchen/dining area, and a private pool.

Food and Dining

Borgo Egnazia staff grow some produce on-site including olive trees, jasmines, prickly pears and lemon trees. Guests can learn to cook Italian dishes with cookery classes in the Trattoria Mia Cucina kitchen. The resort has five restaurants and three bars.

Vair Spa and Leisure

The spa is based on an old Roman bathhouse and uses traditional techniques.  It uses Italian products made from natural sources of the surrounding area.  The spa has received a number of accolades, including 2013: Luxury Spa Awards Nominee, 2013 Tatler Spa Awards- Category Winner, and 2012 the Gala Spa Awards: Innovative Spa Concepts

Borgo Egnazia in the news

Singer Justin Timberlake and actress Jessica Biel married at Borgo Egnazia in October 2012. The ceremony cost $6.5 million as the newly-weds rented the entire resort and flew all guests to the Italian location.
Also were wedded in the same location, Nikesh Arora and Ayesha Thapar, in a ceremony that lasted from 3 July to 9 July 2014.

References

External links

Villas in Apulia